Britton Caillouette, is an American filmmaker and musician. He is most notable as the director of critically acclaimed films Sliding Liberia and Blue Heart.

Personal life
He grew up in Orange County, Southern California and currently lives on a historic farm in Northern California. He studied history at the Center for the North American West at Stanford University. When he was 16 years old, he suffered with cancer. Therefore, he had to amputated a leg in the process.

Career
In 2007, he directed his first documentary in Liberia, West Africa: Sliding Liberia, while an undergraduate at Stanford. In 2013, he joined Farm League. Later he worked on the film Unbroken Grounds in 2016. In 2018, he released his second feature documentary, Blue Heart with the production company 'Patagonia'. The film deals about the fight to save the last wild rivers in Europe from development. In 2019, he made the documentary short Wax & Gold with the collaboration of Stumptown Coffee Roasters and Farm League. The film documents their travels to Ethiopia and its rich history and culture.

Filmography

References

External links
 
 Filmmaker Britton Caillouette: The Kodakery

Living people
American film directors
American film producers
Stanford University alumni
Year of birth missing (living people)